Peter Desmond Farrell (16 August 1922 – 16 March 1999) was an Irish footballer who played as a right-half for, among others, Shamrock Rovers, Everton and Tranmere Rovers. As an international, Farrell also played for both Ireland teams – the FAI XI and the IFA XI. In 1949 he was a member of the FAI XI that defeated England 2–0 at Goodison Park, becoming the first non-UK team to beat England at home. Farrell's playing career followed a similar path to that of Tommy Eglington. As well as teaming up at international level, they also played together at three clubs.

Club career

Shamrock Rovers
Farrell was born and raised in the Convent Road area of Dalkey and was educated at Harold Boy's National School and the Christian Brothers in Dún Laoghaire, which he won a scholarship to. He was playing football with Cabinteely Schoolboys when spotted by a Shamrock Rovers scout and subsequently joined Rovers on his 17th birthday in August 1939. Among his early team-mates was the veteran Jimmy Dunne. With a team that also included Jimmy Kelly, Tommy Eglington, Jimmy McAlinden and Paddy Coad, Farrell later helped Rovers reach three successive FAI Cup finals. They won the competition in 1944 and 1945 and finished as runners up in 1946.

Everton
In July 1946, together with Tommy Eglington, Farrell signed for Everton. In eleven seasons with the club he played 421 league games and scored 14 goals. He also played a further 31 games in the FA Cup and scored a further 4 goals. In 1951 he was appointed Everton captain and during the 1953–54 season he led them to the runners up place in the Second Division, thus gaining promotion to the First Division. During his time with the club his teammates, apart from Eglington, also included Alex Stevenson, Peter Corr, Harry Catterick, Wally Fielding, Tommy E. Jones, Brian Labone and Dave Hickson. He was never sent off during his spell at Goodison Park.

Later years
Farrell left Everton in October 1957 and followed Tommy Eglington to Tranmere Rovers where he became player-manager. He played 114 league games for Tranmere, before leaving in December 1960. After a spell as manager at Sligo Rovers, Farrell became manager of Holyhead Town and, helped by a number of former Everton and Tranmere players, he guided them to the Welsh League (North) title.

In September 1967 Farrell signed a one-year contract to manage St. Patrick's Athletic F.C. .

He managed Pats in their 1967-68 Inter-Cities Fairs Cup ties against FC Girondins de Bordeaux but resigned in March 1968.

He also managed his own insurance business.

Ireland international
When Farrell began his international career in 1946 there were, in effect, two Ireland teams, chosen by two rival associations. Both associations, the Northern Ireland–based IFA and the Ireland–based FAI claimed jurisdiction over the whole of Ireland and selected players from the whole island. As a result, several notable Irish players from this era, including Farrell, played for both teams.

FAI XI
Farrell made 28 appearances and scored three goals for the FAI XI. While still at Shamrock Rovers, he captained the FAI XI on his international debut on 16 June 1946, against Portugal. On 21 September 1949, together with Johnny Carey and Con Martin, he was a member of the FAI XI that defeated England 2–0 at Goodison Park, becoming the first non-UK team to beat England at home. After Martin had put the FAI XI ahead with a penalty in the 33rd minute, Farrell made victory certain in the 85th minute. Tommy O'Connor slipped the ball to Farrell and as the English goalkeeper Bert Williams advanced, Farrell lofted the ball into the unguarded net. He scored his second goal for the FAI XI on 9 October 1949 a in 1–1 draw with Finland, a qualifier for the 1950 FIFA World Cup. His third goal came on 30 May 1951 as Farrell scored the opening goal in a 3–2 win against Norway.

IFA XI
Farrell also made seven appearances for the IFA XI between 1946 and 1949. On 27 November 1946 he made his debut for the IFA XI in a 0–0 draw with Scotland. Together with Johnny Carey, Con Martin, Bill Gorman, Tommy Eglington, Alex Stevenson and Davy Walsh, he was one of seven players born in the Irish Free State to play for the IFA XI that day. The draw helped the team finish as runners-up in the 1947 British Home Championship. Farrell also helped the IFA XI gain some other respectable results, including a 2–0 win against Scotland on 4 October 1947 and a 2–2 draw with England at Goodison Park on 5 November 1947.

Honours

Player

Shamrock Rovers
FAI Cup
Winners 1944, 1945: 2

Ireland
British Home Championship
Runners Up 1946–47 1

Everton
Second Division
Runners Up 1953–54

Manager

Holyhead Town
Welsh League (North)
Winners 1962: 1

Sources
Who's Who of Everton (2004): Tony Matthews 
The Boys in Green – The FAI International Story (1997): Sean Ryan

External links
 Northern Ireland's Footballing Greats

Ireland (FAI) Stats
 Everton Legends
 Profile at Everton fansite
Obituary at Everton fansite
 Obituary in Dalkey Community Council Newsletter

1922 births
1999 deaths
Association footballers from County Dublin
People from Dalkey
Sportspeople from Dún Laoghaire–Rathdown
Republic of Ireland association footballers
Dual Irish international footballers
Ireland (FAI) international footballers
Pre-1950 IFA international footballers
League of Ireland players
Shamrock Rovers F.C. players
Sligo Rovers F.C. players
Everton F.C. players
Tranmere Rovers F.C. players
Holyhead Town F.C. players
Sligo Rovers F.C. managers
Drogheda United F.C. managers
Republic of Ireland football managers
League of Ireland managers
St Patrick's Athletic F.C. managers
Tranmere Rovers F.C. managers
League of Ireland XI players
Republic of Ireland international footballers
Association football wing halves
People educated at C.B.C. Monkstown